Cleocritus was an Athenian leader of religious ceremonies, the kerux or herald, famous for the beauty of his voice. He was one of the Athenians driven from the city during the civil war of the Thirty Tyrants in 403 BCE. When the exiles gathered themselves into an army and returned to the city, Cleocritus was chosen as their spokesman and delivered a famous speech, which Xenophon records (Hellenica 2.4.20-21):

References

First Democracy, The Challenge of an Ancient Idea, Oxford, 2005, p. 83.

5th-century BC Athenians
Eponymous archons